Rutstroemia is a genus of fungi in the family Rutstroemiaceae. It was circumscribed by Petter Karsten in 1871.

The genus name of Rutstroemia is in honour of Carl Birger Rutström (1758–1826), who was a Swedish teacher, botanist and mycologist. Between 1794 and 1798, he worked at the Royal Academy of Turku in Åbo.

Species
As accepted by Species Fungorum;

 Rutstroemia acutispora 
 Rutstroemia alba 
 Rutstroemia allantospora 
 Rutstroemia alni 
 Rutstroemia alnobetulae 
 Rutstroemia articulata 
 Rutstroemia asphodeli 
 Rutstroemia aurantia 
 Rutstroemia aurea 
 Rutstroemia beaglensis 
 Rutstroemia bertholletiae 
 Rutstroemia bolaris 
 Rutstroemia boliviana 
 Rutstroemia bufonia 
 Rutstroemia bulgarioides 
 Rutstroemia calopus 
 Rutstroemia carbonicola 
 Rutstroemia chamaemori 
 Rutstroemia conformata 
 Rutstroemia coracina 
 Rutstroemia corneri 
 Rutstroemia dabaensis 
 Rutstroemia dzhapharovii 
 Rutstroemia elatina 
 Rutstroemia espeletiae 
 Rutstroemia firma 
 Rutstroemia fruticeti 
 Rutstroemia gallincola 
 Rutstroemia gracilipes 
 Rutstroemia henningsiana 
 Rutstroemia hercynica 
 Rutstroemia hirsuta 
 Rutstroemia homocarpa 
 Rutstroemia indica 
 Rutstroemia iridis-aphyllae 
 Rutstroemia juglandis 
 Rutstroemia juniperi 
 Rutstroemia lateritia 
 Rutstroemia leporina 
 Rutstroemia lindaviana 
 Rutstroemia longiasca 
 Rutstroemia macilenta 
 Rutstroemia majalis 
 Rutstroemia maritima 
 Rutstroemia megalospora 
 Rutstroemia microsperma 
 Rutstroemia microspora 
 Rutstroemia nebulosa 
 Rutstroemia nerii 
 Rutstroemia niphogetonis 
 Rutstroemia nothofagi 
 Rutstroemia nummiformis 
 Rutstroemia oligospora 
 Rutstroemia paludosa 
 Rutstroemia petiolorum 
 Rutstroemia pilatii 
 Rutstroemia plana 
 Rutstroemia poluninii 
 Rutstroemia pruni-spinosae 
 Rutstroemia pseudosydowiana 
 Rutstroemia punicae 
 Rutstroemia quercina 
 Rutstroemia remyi 
 Rutstroemia rhenana 
 Rutstroemia rivularis 
 Rutstroemia rosarum 
 Rutstroemia rubi 
 Rutstroemia stagnalis 
 Rutstroemia sulphurea 
 Rutstroemia sydowiana 
 Rutstroemia symingtoniae 
 Rutstroemia tremellosa 
 Rutstroemia urceolus 
 Rutstroemia vacini 
 Rutstroemia venusta 
 Rutstroemia violacea 

Former species;

 R. amentacea  = Ciboria amentacea Sclerotiniaceae
 R. americana  = Ciboria americana Sclerotiniaceae
 R. baccarum  = Monilinia baccarum Sclerotiniaceae
 R. baeumleri  = Ombrophila baeumleri Gelatinodiscaceae
 R. baeumleri  = Ombrophila baeumleri Gelatinodiscaceae
 R. belisensis  = Lambertella belisensis 
 R. caucus  = Ciboria caucus Sclerotiniaceae
 R. ciborioides  = Hymenoscyphus ciborioides Helotiaceae
 R. ciborioides f. tenella  = Sclerotinia tenella Sclerotiniaceae
 R. cuniculi  = Lanzia cuniculi 
 R. curreyana  = Myriosclerotinia curreyana Sclerotiniaceae
 R. echinophila  = Lanzia echinophila 
 R. echinophila var. corticola  = Lanzia echinophila 
 R. fuscobrunnea  = Micropeziza castanea Pezizellaceae
 R. glandicola  = Lanzia glandicola 
 R. guernisacii  = Pachydisca guernisacii Helotiales
 R. hedwigiae  = Ciboria hedwigiae Sclerotiniaceae
 R. johnstonii  = Dencoeliopsis johnstonii 
 R. juncifida  = Myriosclerotinia juncifida Sclerotiniaceae
 R. lanaripes  = Lanzia lanaripes 
 R. latispora  = Lambertella latispora
 R. longipes  = Lanzia longipes 
 R. luteovirescens  = Lanzia luteovirescens 
 R. macrospora  = Tatraea macrospora Helotiaceae
 R. macrospora f. gigaspora  = Tatraea macrospora Helotiaceae
 R. nervisequa  = Rutstroemia conformata 
 R. pinetorum  = Moellerodiscus pinetorum Sclerotiniaceae
 R. pruni-serotinae  = Lanzia pruni-serotinae 
 R. renispora  = Hymenoscyphus renisporus Helotiaceae
 R. sepiacea  = Poculum sepiaceum 
 R. setulata  = Torrendiella setulata 
 R. terrestris  = Phaeohelotium terrestre Helotiaceae
 R. tiliacea  = Encoelia tiliacea Cenangiaceae
 R. tuberosa  = Dumontinia tuberosa Sclerotiniaceae
 R. viarum  = Ciboria viarum Sclerotiniaceae

Note ; If no family shown at end of item, assume Rutstroemiaceae

References

Helotiales
Taxa named by Petter Adolf Karsten
Helotiales genera
Taxa described in 1871